The women's 1500 metres competition was an event at the 2012 Summer Olympics in London, United Kingdom. The competition was held at the Olympic Stadium from 6–10 August. The top two finishers were later found to have used prohibited drugs during this period, and subsequently disqualified. The current silver medalist, Tatyana Tomashova, had served a two-year doping ban (2008–2010) for manipulating samples and was banned after the Olympics for failing another drug test; and the 7th-place finisher Natallia Kareiva and the 9th-place finisher Yekaterina Kostetskaya were later disqualified after being found guilty of doping.

Summary
The qualifying rounds were strategic, with the second heat notably slower than the first and third.  Notable for not qualifying was world championship bronze medalist (and 2009 first finisher) Natalia Rodríguez and Genzebe Dibaba, younger sister of 10000 metres gold medalist Tirunesh Dibaba.

The semifinals were similarly inconsistent.  In the first semi, the race was stringing out behind a last lap charge by Ethiopian born Bahraini Mimi Belete chased by Aslı Çakır Alptekin, the two leaders looking to be sure qualifiers.  At the head of the final straight Alptekin passed Belete for the lead and Belete wilted, falling back through the field and changing the dynamic of the rush for qualifying positions, giving Shannon Rowbury a qualifying spot, while Hilary Stellingwerff and Corinna Harrer had to hope the second semi would go slowly.  It didn't.  Instead the second semi final went out significantly faster with Tatyana Tomashova pushing the pace after the first 200 metres.   With 600 to go, Gamze Bulut passed Tomashova to accelerate the pace further.  Abeba Aregawi stayed on Bulut's shoulder and sprinted past with 200 to go, stringing out the field, leaving reigning world champion Jennifer Simpson behind.

The final started out slowly, none of the entrants wanting to take the lead.  By default Bulut and Maryam Yusuf Jamal found themselves in the lead, Jamal noticeably looking around for someone else to take the pace.  The first lap was 1:15.12, literally a jog for athletes of this caliber.  The second lap slightly faster, reached in 2:23.97.  The two shared the leading duties until the bell, then both accelerated, with the field swarming to join them.  Moments after the bell, Aregawi passed behind Morgan Uceny, who stumbled, her knee meeting the back-kick of Yekaterina Kostetskaya.  Just like her experience in the 2011 World Championships, Uceny found herself on the ground as the field was sprinting away from her, leaving her in tears.  Alptekin passed Bulut with 300 to go.  Aregawi joined the lead group on the back stretch with Jamal and Bulut all jockeying for position behind Alptekin.  Coming onto the home stretch Jamal looked like she was in position to move past Alptekin, but she never gained enough.  Aregawi edged past Jamal with Bulut trying to close the gap.  20 metres before the finish Aregawi suddenly slowed as she was passed by Jamal at the same time as Bulut passed them both.

Doping and aftermath
Suspicions about the race's legitimacy with regard to doping emerged almost immediately. Great Britain's Lisa Dobriskey, who finished 10th, felt fewer qualms about voicing her suspicions, telling reporters immediately after the race, "I don't believe I'm competing on a level playing field." While refusing to accuse any specific athlete of PED use, Dobriskey added that "People will be caught eventually, I think. Fingers crossed, anyway."

In May 2013, several news organizations reported that winner Aslı Çakır Alptekin had tested positive for a banned substance. As her second doping offense, she would face a lifetime ban if found guilty and be stripped of her gold medal. Neither the IAAF nor WADA made an official confirmation of the positive drug test.  On 28 July 2014, IAAF announced that 9th-place finisher Yekaterina Kostetskaya was sanctioned for doping after her biological passport had showed abnormalities. Her result was disqualified.

On 17 August 2015, the Court of Arbitration for Sport approved a settlement agreed to by Alptekin and the IAAF. Alptekin agreed to give up her 1500 m Olympic title and serve an eight-year ban for blood doping. There was no confirmation from the IOC whether the medals would be redistributed.

On 1 June 2016, Turkish media reported that Gamze Bulut had also been found to have employed illegal performance enhancing methods by dint of observations of her athlete 'passport'. It was reported that, if confirmed, Bulut would lose her Olympic and European medals, and all medals and records from 2012 to 2016. IAAF sanctioned her in March 2017 by four year ineligibility and a disqualification since July 2011

In a 2017 story for U.S. sports media giant ESPN, American competitor Shannon Rowbury, who finished sixth, indicated she suspected that several of her opponents were using performance-enhancing drugs, but according to the story's writer Doug Williams "felt powerless to challenge other runners, even after the race." and "It's a bit mind-blowing to think that half of the field shouldn't have been there to begin with."
 
Fourth-place runner Tatyana Tomashova received a two-year ban from 2008–2010 for manipulating doping samples and was banned after the Olympics for failing another drug test. In 2016, the IAAF reported that Ethiopian runner Abeba Aregawi, who initially finished the final in fifth place, had also failed a drug test, though she was reinstated in July.

Belarusian runner Natallia Kareiva, who finished seventh in the final, received a two-year ban in 2014 for doping after her biological passport showed abnormalities. This voided her result from the 2012 Olympics.

Russian runner Yekaterina Kostetskaya was also sanctioned for doping in 2014, disqualifying her initial ninth-place finish.

These developments meant that six of the race's top nine finishers were linked to PED usage. The aforementioned ESPN story called the race "one of the dirtiest in Olympic history."

In 2017, the IOC officially reassigned the gold medal to Maryam Yusuf Jamal, but pending the outcome of anti-doping proceedings against several lower-placed finishers the silver and bronze remain vacant.

In 2018, the IOC reallocated silver and bronze medals, upgrading Tomashova despite her doping suspension.

Competition format

The women's 1500 m competition consisted of heats (round 1), semifinals and a final. The first 6 competitors in each heat of round 1 along with the next six fastest overall qualified for the semifinals. In the semifinals the first five in each heat along with the next two fastest overall qualified for the final. There was a tie for the 12th fastest overall time and both athletes qualified for the final, making a total of 13 athletes.

Records
, the existing World and Olympic records were as follows.

Schedule

All times are British Summer Time (UTC+1)

Results

Round 1
Qual. rule: first 6 of each heat (Q) plus the 6 fastest times (q) qualified.

Heat 1

Heat 2

Heat 3

Semifinals
Qual. rule: first 5 of each semifinal (Q) plus the 2 fastest times (q) qualified.

Heat 1

Heat 2

Finals

References

Athletics at the 2012 Summer Olympics
1500 metres at the Olympics
2012 in women's athletics
Olympic Games controversies
Women's events at the 2012 Summer Olympics